"Just Want to Hold You" is an R&B song released in 1991 by Jasmine Guy. It was the third single from her album, Jasmine Guy and reached top 40 on Billboard's Hot 100 and Hot R&B Singles charts.

Charts

References

1991 singles
Jasmine Guy songs
1991 songs
Warner Records singles